The Creve Coeur Lake Memorial Park Bridge carries Route 364 across the Creve Coeur Lake Memorial Park in Maryland Heights, Missouri.

Bridges in Greater St. Louis
Bridges in St. Louis County, Missouri
Bridges completed in 2003
Road bridges in Missouri